Cinnamodendron corticosum is a species of flowering plant in the family Canellaceae. It is found in Jamaica.

References 
	

corticosum